Danube is a city in Renville County, Minnesota, United States. The population was 505 at the 2010 census.

History
Danube was laid out in 1899, and named after the Danube, the European river. A post office called Danube has been in operation since 1903.

Geography

Demographics

As of 2000 the median income for a household in the city was $40,000, and the median income for a family was $43,750. Males had a median income of $35,781 versus $22,000 for females. The per capita income for the city was $18,807. About 3.8% of families and 5.6% of the population were below the poverty line, including 5.3% of those under age 18 and 7.5% of those age 65 or over.

2010 census
As of the census of 2010, there were 505 people, 209 households, and 145 families residing in the city. The racial makeup of the city was 97.4% White, 1.2% African American, 0.2% Asian, 0.2% from other races, and 1.0% from two or more races. Hispanic or Latino of any race were 6.7% of the population.

There were 209 households, of which 30.1% had children under the age of 18 living with them, 56.9% were married couples living together, 6.7% had a female householder with no husband present, 5.7% had a male householder with no wife present, and 30.6% were non-families. 26.8% of all households were made up of individuals, and 12.9% had someone living alone who was 65 years of age or older. The average household size was 2.42 and the average family size was 2.90.

The median age in the city was 39.8 years. 24% of residents were under the age of 18; 8.3% were between the ages of 18 and 24; 22.2% were from 25 to 44; 28.1% were from 45 to 64; and 17.2% were 65 years of age or older. The gender makeup of the city was 48.7% male and 51.3% female.

Arts and culture

Annual cultural events
Danube Fun Days, the city's annual celebration, is an extended weekend with many traditional events taking place during the second weekend in July.

Notable person
 Bob Bruggers - Former NFL linebacker and professional wrestler.

References

External links 
 
 
 City-Data.com
 ePodunk: Profile for Danube, Minnesota

Cities in Minnesota
Cities in Renville County, Minnesota